On or about 1850, Charles B. Allen  founded the New York-based secret society Order of the Star Spangled Banner during the rise of the Know Nothing Party and the rise of nativism in the United States.

References

Year of birth missing
Year of death missing
New York (state) Know Nothings
People from New York (state)